, known in Japan as  for Game Boy Advance, and  for GameCube and Xbox, and in Europe as Pro Tennis WTA Tour, is a tennis video game published and developed by Konami in 2001-2002.

Reception

The game received "mixed or average reviews" on all platforms except the Xbox version, which received "generally unfavorable reviews", according to the review aggregation website Metacritic. In Japan, Famitsu gave it a score of 26 out of 40 for the Pro Evolution versions, and 25 out of 40 for the original and Pocket versions.

References

External links

2001 video games
Konami games
Now Production games
Game Boy Advance games
GameCube games
PlayStation 2 games
Xbox games
Tennis video games
WTA Tour
Video games developed in Japan